Nick Wilson (born April 21, 1996) is an American football running back who is currently a free agent. Wilson signed with the Chicago Bears as an undrafted free agent.

Early years 
Wilson attended Central High School in Fresno, California. As a senior, he was the Tri-River Athletic Conference Offensive Player of the Year after rushing for 1,119 yards on 126 carries. As a junior in 2012 he rushed for a school record 1,627 yards. Wilson was a four-star recruit by Rivals.com. In March 2013, he committed to the University of Arizona to play college football.

College career 
In Wilson's first career college game he rushed for 104 yards on seven carries with a touchdown. Against Utah, Wilson rushed for 218 yards with three touchdowns on 20 carries.

College statistics

Professional career

Awards and honors 
2016
Doak Walker Award Preseason Watchlist

†Shared award

References

External links 
Arizona Wildcats bio

Living people
Sportspeople from Fresno, California
Players of American football from California
American football running backs
Arizona Wildcats football players
1996 births